Mohamed Aman Faizer (born 12 March 1999; better known as Aman Faizer) is a Sri Lankan footballer who plays as a midfielder for Sri Lanka Champions League club Renown and the Sri Lanka national team.

References

External links
 
 

Living people
1999 births
Sri Lankan footballers
Sri Lanka international footballers
Association football forwards
Sri Lanka Football Premier League players